Mad Dog and the Butcher is a Canadian documentary film, directed by Thomas Rinfret and released in 2019. The film is a portrait of the Vachon family of professional wrestlers, including Maurice "Mad Dog" Vachon and Paul "Butcher" Vachon.

The film premiered at the Quebec City Film Festival (FCVQ) in September 2019.

Awards
At the FCVQ, the film won the Prix Jury cinéphile for best first film.

The film received three Prix Iris nominations at the 22nd Quebec Cinema Awards in 2020, for Best Documentary Film, Best Cinematography in a Documentary (Dominic Dorval, Vincent Masse, Thomas Rinfret, Richard Tremblay) and Best Editing in a Documentary (Benoit Côté, Thomas Rinfret).

References

External links

2019 films
Canadian sports documentary films
Canadian wrestling films
Quebec films
Professional wrestling documentary films
2010s Canadian films